William R. Davis (December 4, 1941 – March 17, 2002) was an American football coach.  He served as the head football coach at South Carolina State University, Savannah State University, Tennessee State University, and Johnson C. Smith University. Davis won four conference championships and made two appearances in the NCAA Division I-AA playoffs at South Carolina State.  Under Davis, Savannah State posted its only appearance in the NCAA Division II playoffs.

Early life
Davis was the son of Lee Davis, Sr. truck driver, and Gertrude Stevens-Davis, a domestic housekeeper, and the youngest of three children. He graduated from Sims High School in 1961, where he was an exceptional athlete, lettering in all sports. He earned a four-year scholarship that same year to attend Johnson C. Smith University in Charlotte, North Carolina, and was coached under the leadership of Eddie McGirt; it was at Johnson C. Smith that Davis was an all CIAA standout in football.

Upon graduation from college, Davis returned to his hometown to coach at Sims High School for a year. In 1966, Davis was hired by Sandy Gilliam to coach at Maryland State College—now known as the University of Maryland Eastern Shore—where he served until 1969 to return to his alma mater Johnson C. Smith University where he worked with his college coach and mentor Eddie McGirt for four seasons. In 1973, Davis went to work alongside his childhood friend Willie Jeffries at South Carolina State College—now known as South Carolina State University—where he worked with Jefferies for six seasons until Jefferies took the post at Wichita State University in 1979. It was Davis that succeeded Jefferies to coach the Bulldogs until 1986.

Coaching career

South Carolina State
Davis served as an assistant coach for Willie Jeffries for six seasons (1973–1978) before succeeding Jeffries as the Bulldogs head coach in 1979. Davis was the head football coach at South Carolina State University from 1979 until 1985 and compiled a 53–25–1 record as head coach.  The team's 10–1 record in 1980 resulted in a Mid-Eastern Athletic Conference (MEAC) championship. In 1981 the team completed the season with a 10–3 record and was named the black college football national champions and the MEAC champion. The 1982 team record was 9–3 and resulted in a third consecutive MEAC title. The 1983 team's record was 7–3 and won another MEAC title.

Savannah State
Davis served as the head football coach at Savannah State College from 1986 to 1992 and Savannah State University from 2000 until his death in 2002 . Under Davis, the Tigers compiled a 52–40 record and posted their only appearance in the NCAA Division II playoffs in 1992.

Tennessee State
Davis was the 17th head coach at Tennessee State University in Nashville, Tennessee, serving for three seasons, from 1993 to 1995.  His record at Tennessee State was 11–22.

Johnson C. Smith
Davis became head coach at Johnson C. Smith in 1997, serving for two seasons. His record was 8–12.

Head coaching record

References

External links
 

1941 births
2002 deaths
Johnson C. Smith Golden Bulls football coaches
Johnson C. Smith Golden Bulls football players
Maryland Eastern Shore Hawks football coaches
Savannah State Tigers and Lady Tigers athletic directors
Savannah State Tigers football coaches
South Carolina State Bulldogs football coaches
Tennessee State Tigers football coaches
High school football coaches in South Carolina
People from Union, South Carolina
Players of American football from South Carolina
African-American coaches of American football
African-American players of American football
African-American college athletic directors in the United States
20th-century African-American sportspeople
21st-century African-American people